State Highway 62 (SH 62) is a  state highway in the U.S. state of Colorado. SH 62's western terminus is at SH 145 in Placerville, and the eastern terminus is at U.S. Route 550 (US 550) in Ridgway.

Route description
SH 62 starts at a junction with  SH 145 just north of Placerville, Colorado in the San Miguel River valley and heads northeast up the Leopard Creek Canyon. It then follows Cottonwood and Dallas creeks downstream to Ridgway, Colorado. The highway crosses the Uncompahgre River just before ending at a junction with  US 550.

State Highway 62 is part of the San Juan Skyway, designated as a National Scenic Byway in 1996.

Major intersections

References

External links

062
Roads in Ouray County, Colorado
Transportation in San Miguel County, Colorado